"Fools Lullaby" is a song recorded by Welsh singer Bonnie Tyler for her ninth studio album, Angel Heart (1992). It was released by Hansa Records as the lead single from the album, written by Tyler's at-the-time producer, Dieter Bohlen. The single was most successful in Norway where it peaked at number six. The lyrics depict Tyler asking her ex-lover to rekindle their relationship.

Critical reception
Charlotte Dillon from AllMusic highlighted "Fools Lullaby" as a "top-notch track" in a review of Tyler's album Angel Heart.

Chart performance
"Fools Lullaby" gave Tyler her eighth top ten hit in Norway. The song debuted on the Norwegian Singles Chart at number eight, rising to its peak at number six in the following week, and spent a total of five weeks on the chart.

In Austria, "Fools Lullaby" debuted at number 27, peaking at number 17 and spent a total of twelve weeks on the chart.

Live performances
Tyler performed "Fools Lullaby" on Norwegian game show Casino in 1992. In the same year, she also performed the song on the German TV program Peter's Pop Show. On 31 December 1992, Tyler performed "Fools Lullaby" on the French TV show Le monde est à vous.

Format and track listing

 CD single
"Fools Lullaby" (Radio Mix) — 3:48
"Fools Lullaby" (Sweet Lullaby Mix) — 5:30
"Race to the Fire" (Radio Mix) — 3:53
"Race to the Fire" (Race Mix) — 5:26

 Dutch 7" LP
"Fools Lullaby" (Radio Mix) — 3:52
"Race to the Fire" (Radio Mix) — 3:53

Charts

Weekly charts

Year–end charts

References

Bonnie Tyler songs
1992 singles
1992 songs
Songs written by Dieter Bohlen
Song recordings produced by Dieter Bohlen